Don Bradman (1908–2001) was an Australian cricketer who is widely acknowledged as the greatest batsman of all time.

Don or Donald Bradman may also refer to:

Don Bradman in popular culture
Don Bradman with the Australian cricket team in England in 1948
Don Bradman's batting technique
Controversies involving Don Bradman
List of international cricket centuries by Don Bradman

Namesakes
Don Bradman Cricket 14, a 2014 cricket video game
Don Bradman Cricket 17, a 2016 cricket video game
Sir Donald Bradman Drive, Adelaide, a major arterial road
Sir Donald Bradman Oration, a cricket calendar event held in Australia
"Our Don Bradman", a 1930 song by Jack O'Hagan

See also
Bradman (disambiguation)
The Don (disambiguation)